The 1990 Virginia Slims of Oklahoma was a women's tennis tournament played on indoor hard courts at The Greens Country Club in Oklahoma City, Oklahoma in the United States and was part of the Tier IV category of the 1990 WTA Tour. It was the fifth edition of the tournament and ran from February 19 through February 25, 1990. Third-seeded Amy Frazier won the singles title and earned $27,000 first-prize money.

Finals

Singles
 Amy Frazier defeated  Manon Bollegraf 6–4, 6–2
 It was Frazier's 1st title of the year and the 2nd of her career.

Doubles
 Mary-Lou Daniels /  Wendy White defeated  Manon Bollegraf /  Lise Gregory 7–5, 6–2

References

External links
 ITF tournament edition details
 Tournament draws
 Tournament advertisement 

Virginia Slims of Oklahoma
U.S. National Indoor Championships
Virginia Slims of Oklahoma
Virginia Slims of Oklahoma
Virginia Slims of Oklahoma